Number One Hits is a compilation album by American country music duo The Judds. It was released on October 25, 1994 on the Curb and RCA Nashville  labels. The album contained music produced by Brent Maher and Don Potter. Number One Hits was the eleventh compilation released in The Judds's discography. It contained 12 of their number one hits on the country charts during the 1980s. The album itself also reached major chart positions and sales certifications.

Background and content
The album contained songs originally recorded by The Judds between 1983 and 1989. The original sessions were produced by Brent Maher, with some assistance from Don Potter. Number One Hits was released three years following the disbandment of The Judds. In 1991, they ended their musical partnership after Naomi Judd was diagnosed with Hepatitis C. Wynonna Judd embarked on her own music career in 1992. In the years that followed, their former labels (Curb/RCA) would issue several more compilation albums, including this package.

The album package consisted of 12 tracks, all of which had been number one hits on the Billboard Hot Country Songs chart. Among its songs was the duo's first number one hit, "Mama He's Crazy" (1984). Also included was 1986's "Grandpa (Tell Me 'Bout the Good Old Days)" and 1989's "Let Me Tell You About Love." The album also included the number one single "Change of Heart," which was composed by Naomi Judd. Despite including 12 songs, The Judds actually had 14 number one singles on the Billboard country chart. Missing from the collection was "Cry Myself to Sleep" (1986) and "Maybe Your Baby's Got the Blues" (1987).

Release and chart performance
Number One Hits was released on October 25, 1994 via Curb and RCA Records. It was The Judds's eleventh compilation release. The package was issued as a compact disc and a cassette in its original release. In later years it would be re-issued as a music download to several sites, including Apple Music. Number One Hits reached number 39 on the Billboard Top Country Albums in 1995 after spending five weeks on the list. It also spent one week on the Billboard 200 albums chart, peaking at number 187 in June 1995. It was The Judds's fifth compilation to reach a charting position on the Billboard country albums survey. It was also their final charting album of the decade. In 2002, Number One Hits certified gold in sales from the Recording Industry Association of America for reaching sales of over 500,000 copies. It is the duo's most recent album certification from the RIAA.

Track listing

Compact disc and digital versions

Cassette version

Personnel
All credits are adapted from the liner notes of Number One Hits.

Musical and technical personnel
 Dennis Carney – photography
 Mario Casilli – photography
 Susan Eddy – art direction
 Naomi Judd – harmony vocals
 Wynonna Judd – lead vocals
 Brent Maher – producer
 Jim McGuire – photography
 Peter Nash – photography
 Don Potter – assistant producer (tracks 4, 10-12)
 Julie Wanca – design

Chart performance

Certifications

Release history

References

1994 compilation albums
Curb Records compilation albums
The Judds compilation albums
RCA Records compilation albums